Squalus hawaiiensis, the Hawaiian spurdog, is a dogfish, a member of the family Squalidae, found in waters surrounding the Hawaiian Islands, from the surface to 950 m.  Its length is up to 75 cm.

Taxonomy
Squalus hawaiiensis was once lumped with the shortspine spurdog, but morphological and genetic data showed that the Hawaiian population was distinct from S. mitsukurii individuals from Japan to be considered a distinct species.

References

Squalus
Fish described in 2018